William Griffith (1480–1545) of Penrhyn Castle was a Welsh politician.

He was knighted at Touraine in 1513 and was Chamberlain of North Wales in 1520. He was with Henry VIII of England at the Sieges of Boulogne (1544–46).

Family 
He was the son of Sir William Griffith and Jane Troutbeck and was married to Jane Stradling, daughter of Thomas Stradling, and then later to Jane Puleston, daughter of John Puleston. By Jane Stradling he had a son, Rees Griffith, who became a High Sheriff, and a daughter, Margaret Griffith, who married Simon Thelwall. By Jane Puleston he had a daughter, Sibill Griffith, who married Owen ap Hugh.

References 

1480 births
1545 deaths
Welsh political people